The Spalding Building, formerly the Oregon Bank Building, is a historic office building in downtown Portland, Oregon, United States on the northwest corner of SW 3rd Avenue and Washington streets. Since 1982, it has been on the National Register of Historic Places.

Architect Cass Gilbert worked on the American Renaissance-style Spalding building while also working on the Woolworth Building in New York City. Completed in 1911, it was considered a skyscraper.

The  building contains 12 above-ground floors, and its construction mimics a classical column: A base, a shaft, and a capital.

In spring 2016, Squarespace, a website-design company based in New York City, moved its Portland office to the Spalding Building, in newly renovated space used by around 150 employees.

See also
Architecture of Portland, Oregon
National Register of Historic Places listings in Southwest Portland, Oregon

References

External links
 
 Spalding Building (Emporis)

1911 establishments in Oregon
Buildings and structures completed in 1911
Skyscraper office buildings in Portland, Oregon
Cass Gilbert buildings
National Register of Historic Places in Portland, Oregon
Portland Historic Landmarks
Southwest Portland, Oregon